The White Mountains Region is a tourism region designated by the New Hampshire Division of Travel and Tourism. It is located in northern New Hampshire in the United States and is named for the White Mountains, which cover most of the region. The southern boundary of the region begins at Piermont on the west, and runs east to Campton, then on to Conway and the Maine border. The northern boundary begins at Littleton and runs east to Gorham and the Maine border. The region to the north is known as the Great North Woods Region, which should not be confused with the larger and more general Great North Woods.

The region includes the southern part of Coos County and northern sections of Grafton County and Carroll County.

Important settlements in the region include:

Littleton
Whitefield
Bethlehem
Gorham
North Conway
Conway
Lincoln
Campton

The region is bisected into east and west portions by Interstate 93 (from Campton to Littleton). Other major highways in the region include U.S. Highway 302 (Woodsville to Conway), New Hampshire State Route 16 (from Gorham to Conway), State Route 10 (from Littleton to Piermont), and U.S. Route 2 from Lancaster to Shelburne. U.S. Route 3 parallels I-93, except north of Franconia Notch, where it branches off to Twin Mountain and Whitefield.

The Cohos Trail and Appalachian Trail both traverse the White Mountains region.

Highlights 

Highlights in the region include:
 Outdoor recreation in the White Mountain National Forest
 United States Forest Service Ranger Stations in Bethlehem, Gorham and Conway
 Mount Washington State Park, Cog Railway, Auto Road, Observatory
 Mount Washington Valley region, including the towns and villages of Conway, North Conway, Intervale, Glen, Jackson, Bartlett, Hart's Location, Albany, Eaton, Effingham, Freedom, Madison, Tamworth, and Ossipee
 Franconia Notch State Park, featuring the site of the natural rock outcropping known as the Old Man of the Mountain, which crumbled and fell in early May 2003
 Forest Lake State Park, Crawford Notch State Park, Moose Brook State Park,  Pinkham Notch Scenic Area
 Alpine skiing at seven or more major downhill ski area and seven cross-country skiing areas for ski touring
 Mount Washington Regional Airport, aka, White Mountain Regional Airport
 Covered bridges in Littleton, Woodsville, Bartlett,  Jackson and Lincoln, among others
 Water sports on the Connecticut River from Littleton to Piermont
 Saco River, Swift River
 The scenic Kancamagus Highway from Lincoln to Conway
 Golf in Bethlehem,  Whitefield, Jefferson, Jackson, North Conway, Bretton Woods
 Several amusement- or theme parks, in Jefferson, Lincoln, North Conway
 Information centers in Lincoln, Campton, North Conway, Littleton (Moore Station) and Gorham

See also 

 Presidential Range

References

External links 
White Mountains region at NH Division of Travel and Tourism Development
White Mountains New Hampshire, official convention and visitors' bureau for the region

Regions of New Hampshire
Tourism regions of New Hampshire